In ancient contexts, Disciples of Christ may refer to:
 Disciple (Christianity),  a common word for people who followed Jesus Christ during his lifetime, particularly the Twelve Disciples or the Seventy Disciples  

In modern contexts, Disciples of Christ may refer to:
Disciples of Christ (Campbell Movement), a Christian group that arose during the Second Great Awakening of the early 19th century
Christian Church (Disciples of Christ), a current mainline Protestant denomination in North America that is descended from the Campbell movement
Disciples of Christ (hip hop group), a Christian rap group
Disciple of Christ (abbreviated as D.Ch.), title awarded by West Kalimantan Christian Church for those who have completed courses of the church discipleship program

See also
Disciple (disambiguation)